Corynactis annulata, or the strawberry anemone, is a bright pink colonial anthozoan similar in body form to sea anemones and scleractinian stony corals. This species is a solitary animal of the order Corallimorpharia.

Description
The strawberry anemone is a very distinctive small bright pink anemone having white knobs on the ends of its tentacle tips. Green and reddish colour morphs are also known.

Distribution
It is also known from the Inaccessible Archipelago in the southern Atlantic Ocean.

Ecology
It occurs in clusters and sheets on rocky reefs and wrecks. It feeds on small planktonic organisms.

References

Corallimorphidae
Cnidarians of the Atlantic Ocean
Marine fauna of Africa
Animals described in 1867